The 2004 South Tyneside Metropolitan Borough Council election took place on 10 June 2004 to elect members of South Tyneside Metropolitan Borough Council in Tyne and Wear, England. The whole council was up for election with boundary changes since the last election in 2003 reducing the number of seats by 6. The Labour Party stayed in overall control of the council.

Campaign
Before the election, South Tyneside was seen as one of Labour's safest councils in the north east of EnglandLabour having 49 of the 60 councillors; they were expected to remain in control of the council. The Boundary Committee for England had made changes in South Tyneside's wards since the 2003 election and these meant there would be 54 councillors elected from 18 wards, instead of the previous 60 councillors from 20 wards. The changes abolished All Saints and Rekendyke wards and new ward names included Biddick and All Saints, Hebburn North and Simonside and Rekendyke.

Labour was the only party which contested all 54 seats that were up for election, with the other candidates being made up of 23 Conservatives, 22 Liberal Democrats, 13 independents, 12 Progressives, 3 British National Party and 1 each from the Green Party and the National Front. The independent candidates included 4 former Labour councillors who had quit the party to stand as independents, Mervyn Owen, Tom Defty, Jim Caine and Allen Branley, as well as Allen Branley's wife Jane Branley.

The election was held with all postal voting, but delays relating to the printers meant that many voters received their ballot papers almost a week late.

Election result
The results saw Labour defend a reduced majority on the council after winning 35 of the 54 seats. The independents and Progressives were jointly the largest opposition groups after the election after winning 6 seats each, with the Progressive leader, Jim Capstick, saying that the boundary changes had helped them to win all of the seats in Harton and West Park wards. The gains for the independents included the former Labour councillors, Tom Defty, who defeated the mayor and wife of the council leader, Linda Waggott, in Bede ward, and Allen Braley in Westoe ward, who was elected along with his wife Jane.

Meanwhile, the Conservatives had 3 councillors after the election, the most for decades, after winning all 3 seats in Cleadon and East Boldon ward at the expense of the Liberal Democrats. Among the Liberal Democrats who failed to be elected in Cleadon and East Boldon was the leader of the party on the council, Jim Selby, but the party did gain one seat in Biddick & All Saints ward.

Ward results

References

2004 English local elections
2004
21st century in Tyne and Wear